Boronia viridiflora is a species of shrub that is endemic to a small area in the Northern Territory and grows horizontally from vertical rock faces. The flowers are borne singly or in groups of up to three in leaf axils and are green with a burgundy tinge.

Description
Boronia viridiflora is a shrub that typically grows to a height of about  growing horizontally from vertical rock faces. The plant is glabrous apart from the petals. The sepals and petals do not enlarge significantly as the fruit develops.

Taxonomy and naming
Boronia viridiflora was first formally described in 1997 by Marco F. Duretto who published the description in the journal Australian Systematic Botany. The specific epithet (viridiflora) is derived from the Latin viridis meaning "green" and -florus meaning "-flowered", referring to the colour of the flowers.

Distribution and habitat
This boronia is only known from two populations that grow on vertical sandstone rock faces in privately managed land in Arnhem Land.

Conservation status
This species is classified as "vulnerable" under the Australian Government Environment Protection and Biodiversity Conservation Act 1999 and the Territory Parks and Wildlife Conservation Act 2000. Prior to 2006, the estimated population size was estimated to be about 700, but Cyclone Monica may have had severely damaged the populations and the current population size is unknown. The populations are also threatened by altered fire regimes. A National Recovery Plan for this species and B. quadrilata has been prepared.

References 

viridiflora
Flora of the Northern Territory
Plants described in 1997
Taxa named by Marco Duretto